Letourneur is a French surname. Notable people with the surname include:

Étienne-François Letourneur (1751–1817), French lawyer, soldier, and politician
François-Joseph Alexandre Letourneur (1769–1843), French soldier
Pierre Le Tourneur (1736–1788), French author and translator
René Letourneur (1898–1990), sculptor